Defiant Comics was a comic book publishing imprint of Enlightened Entertainment Partners, LP. Defiant was established in 1993 by former Marvel Comics and Valiant Comics editor-in-chief Jim Shooter.

Publication history 
Defiant was founded in the wake of Jim Shooter's departure from Valiant. After attempting unsuccessfully to retain his partial ownership of Voyager Communications (Valiant's parent company) Shooter founded a new company that included some Valiant artists and writers on its staff. He formed a business venture with The River Group to help finance Defiant.

In early 1993, Defiant announced that its first title, Plasm, would be released as a series of trading cards that could be put together in an album to form "issue #0". Upon hearing the news, Marvel Comics threatened a lawsuit against Defiant, claiming the new title violated a Marvel UK trademark for their book/character Plasmer. Though Defiant changed the title to Warriors of Plasm, Marvel continued its lawsuit. While the court eventually ruled in favor of Defiant, the legal process depleted the company's capital, having cost over $300,000 in legal fees. Defiant ceased publication in Summer 1995.

Announced plans 
Shooter had originally planned to publish an intracompany "crossover" featuring all the characters and titles in the self-contained Defiant universe, similar to the Secret Wars crossover miniseries he had done at Marvel and the Unity crossover miniseries he had also completed before his dismissal at Valiant. To have been titled "Schism", the crossover was intended to take place in a four-issue miniseries, with the regular ongoing titles retelling the parts relevant to the respective characters of each. Only two crossover-related issues (Dogs of War No. 5 and Warriors of Plasm #13) were published before the company went out of business. The plots for the miniseries were eventually posted online.

Titles

Initial 
 Dark Dominion
 The Good Guys
 Warriors of Plasm (originally Plasm)

Second wave 
 Charlemagne
 Dogs of War
 Prudence & Caution
 War Dancer

One-shots 
 The Birth of The Defiant Universe
 Glory
 Great Grimmax
 The Origin of The Defiant Universe aka Defiant Genesis 
 Splatterball

Graphic novels 
 Warriors of Plasm – Home For the Holidays (officially titled as Warriors of Plasm Graphic Novel # 1 in the comic's legal indicia)

Trade paperback 
 Warriors of Plasm: The Collected Edition (Feb. 1994) (reprints Warriors of Plasm #0–4 and Splatterball)

Notes

References

 Defiant Comics at the Grand Comics Database
 World Talk Radio: Interview with Jim Shooter

 
Defunct comics and manga publishing companies
Comic book publishing companies of the United States
1993 establishments in New York City
Publishing companies established in 1993